Iacono is a surname of Italian origin. Notable people with the surname include:

 Alessandro Iacono (born 1973), former Italian professional footballer
 Franck Iacono (born 1966), French freestyle swimmer
 Paul Iacono (born 1954), American producer, writer, director
 Gianluca Iacono (born 1970), Italian voice actor
 Maurizio Iacono, member of the Canadian rock band Kataklysm
 Paul Iacono (born 1988), American actor
 Sal Iacono (born 1971), American comedian
 William Iacono, American psychologist